Yusuf ibn al-Hasan (c. 1607-c. 1640), christened Dom Jerónimo Chingulia, was ruler of Mombasa from 1614 to 1632.

After his father's assassination in 1614, he was sent to Goa to be educated, and was crowned Sultan in 1626. In August 1631, he renounced Christianity, massacred the Portuguese garrison and ordered all people in the city to convert to Islam.  In May 1632, he fled the city and turned to piracy.

References 

Year of birth uncertain
People from Mombasa
17th-century pirates
1640 deaths
1607 births